This year's Sheffield City Council election was held 13 May 1965. One third of the council was up for election, with as many as four double vacancies in the wards of Crookesmoor, Owlerton, Walkley and Woodseats. The Conservatives managed to gain one of the Walkley seats up for election, as the only gain of the night. Overall turnout fell by a tenth on the previous year's, to 26.2%.

Election result

The result had the following consequences for the total number of seats on the Council after the elections:

Ward results

References

Sheffield City Council election
1965
City Council election, 1965
Sheffield City Council election